Paul Bradford (born 1 December 1963) is a former Irish politician who served as a Senator for the Agricultural Panel from 1987 to 1989 and 2002 to 2016. He served as a Teachta Dála (TD) for the Cork East constituency from 1989 to 2002.

Early and private life
Bradford was born in Mourne Abbey near Mallow, County Cork in 1963. He was educated at the Patrician Academy in Mallow. He is married to former Renua Ireland TD Lucinda Creighton.

Political career
Bradford became involved in politics at a young age, becoming the youngest-ever member of Cork County Council when he was elected in 1985 at the age of 21. Two years later in 1987 he was elected to the 18th Seanad on the Agricultural Panel, becoming the youngest-ever elected Senator. As a member of Seanad Éireann he was Fine Gael spokesperson on Communications and Energy. At the 1989 general election he was elected to Dáil Éireann for the first time for the Cork East constituency. In 1994 he joined John Bruton's front bench as spokesperson on Defence and the Marine.

In 1994, Fine Gael came to power and Bradford became Co-Chair of the British–Irish Parliamentary Assembly. In 1997, the party was back in opposition and he was appointed spokesperson on Health, Food Safety and Older People. In 2000, Bradford became spokesperson on Youth Affairs, School Transport and Adult Education. Under Michael Noonan's leadership he was promoted to party Chief Whip, in which position he served until he lost his seat at the 2002 general election. He was subsequently elected to Seanad Éireann as a Senator for the Agricultural Panel. He was appointed Fine Gael spokesperson on Agriculture, Fisheries and Food in the Seanad.

He was an unsuccessful candidate in Cork East for Dáil Éireann at the 2007 general election but was re-elected to the Seanad. He was again re-elected to the Seanad in 2011. He was the Fine Gael Seanad spokesperson on Justice until July 2013.

Bradford was expelled from the Fine Gael parliamentary party on 16 July 2013 when he defied the party whip by voting against the Protection of Life During Pregnancy Bill 2013. On 13 September 2013, he and six other expellees formed the Reform Alliance, described as a "loose alliance" rather than a political party.

He joined the Renua Ireland on its foundation in March 2015 and contested the 2016 general election for the party in Cork East, but, like all the party's candidates, failed to win a seat.

References

1963 births
Living people
Fine Gael TDs
Independent members of Seanad Éireann
20th-century Irish farmers
Local councillors in County Cork
Members of the 18th Seanad
Members of the 22nd Seanad
Members of the 23rd Seanad
Members of the 24th Seanad
Members of the 26th Dáil
Members of the 27th Dáil
Members of the 28th Dáil
Renua Ireland politicians
Spouses of Irish politicians
Fine Gael senators
21st-century Irish farmers